The Adjutant of His Excellency is a Soviet television mini-series which was produced in 1969 and is set during the Russian civil war. The plot revolves around Captain Pavel Koltsov, an agent working for the Soviet secret police who is spying on the white Volunteer Army, posing as an adjutant to a chief commander, general Kovalevsky.

Plot
In the spring of 1919, Pavel Andreevitch Koltsov (Yuri Solomin), an agent of the Reds, is sent as the head of the Cheka by Martin Latsis into the Volunteer Army. On the road, he and several other White officers are captured by the "Greens" of Evgeniy Angel. Taking advantage of a right moment, Koltsov takes possession of arms, and the officers along with two Red Army commanders, also prisoners of Angel, with a fight break out of captivity. After hearing the story about the escape, Commander Vladimir Kovalevsky Zenonovich (modeled after General Vladimir May-Mayevsky) appoints Koltsov as his adjutant. Koltsov runs several covert operations while successfully passing all tests regarding his legendary status and does not give in to provocations of the counterintelligence. At the same time there is a romantic side plot in which Pavel Koltsov wins over the daughter of Colonel Shchukin Thani, chief of counterintelligence.

Another important plot line is the fate of Yuri Lvov, the son of the White colonel who was killed in battle. The boy is going through a series of tragic adventures on both sides of the front until Koltsov starts taking care of him. The observant Yura guesses that Koltsov is a spy for the Reds. In a frank discussion, Koltsov manages to convince Yura that he is acting with good and noble intentions.

At the end of the film Koltsov sacrifices himself to destroy the special train of the Whites with British tanks, which is driven to the front. Koltsov gets arrested and imminent death awaits him.

The titles before each series state "Dedicated to the first Chekists".

Cast
Yury Solomin as Pavel Andreevich Koltsov, also known as "Old Man", captain, adjutant of General Kovalevsky
Vladislav Strzhelchik as Lieutenant-General Vladimir Zenonovich Kovalevsky, commander of the Volunteer Army
Vladimir Kozel as Colonel Nikolay G. Shchukin, head of counterintelligence of the Volunteer Army (according to A. Dvigubski, real name Shuchkin )).
Tatiana Ivanitskaya as Tanya Shchukina, daughter of Colonel Shchukin
Alexander Milokostiy as Yura, son of Colonel Lvov
Anatoli Papanov as Yevgeny  Angel, gang leader of the "Greens" (a historical figure)
Victor Pavlov as Miron Osadchy, a member of Angel's gang, later an intelligence agent of the Whites
Michael Kokshenov as Pavel, a member of Angel's gang
Yevgeny Tashkov as Martin Yanovich Latsis, the head of the All-Ukrainian Cheka (a historical figure)
Nikolay Timofeev as Frolov, Red security officer
Yevgeny Shutov as Semyon Krasilnikov, Red security officer
Andrei Petrov as Sirotin, Red commander
Yuriy Nazarov as Emelyanov, Red commander
Daniel Netrebin as Red Commander
Gennady Karnovich-Valois as Colonel Lvov
Oleg Golubitskiy as gendarme captain Wolin
Vladimir Grossman as Lieutenant / Captain Duditsky
Igor Starygin as  Mickey, lieutenant, junior adjutant of Kovalevsky
Valentin Smirnitsky as Captain Rostovtsev
Gediminas Girdvainis as  Intelligence Lieutenant
German Yushko as  Timka, Angel's orderly
Yuri Medvedev as Nikita, a member of Angel's gang
Nikolai Gritsenko as  Vikentiy Pavlovich Speransky, director of the Kiev White underground movement
Sofya Pavlova as  Ksenia Andreevna, wife of Speransky
Boris Novikov  Isaac Liberson, the Kiev jeweler
Elizaveta Auerbach as  Sofa, wife of Liberson
Lev Polyakov as  Zagladin, a member of the White underground movement
Ivan Solovyov as  Reznikov, chief of staff of the Reds
Nikolai Grabbe as  Kosobrodov
Konstantin Zheldin as  Captain Viktor Zakharovich Osipov, counterintelligence officer of the Volunteer Army, assistant of Shchukin
Alexey Presnetsov as  Basov, or "Nikolai Nikolaevich", former colonel, operations chief of army staff of Reds and White spy
Sergey Zeitz as   Binsky, Kiev White underground worker,
Sergey Polezhaev as  Kiev White underground fighter, "brother" of Binsky
Lyudmila Chursina as  Oksana
Peter Dolzhanov as  Lev Fedotov, jeweler
Peter Kudlay as  mayor of Kharkov, colonel Schetinin (a historical figure)
Yevgeny Teterin as  Startsev, numismatist, courier for the Reds
Larissa Danilina as  Natasha, daughter of a coin collector, resident of the intelligence network of the Reds
Alexander Barushnoy as  English Brigadier Brix, a representative of the Allied
Gleb Plaksin as  french general
Vera Yenyutina as  false Koltsov's mother
Aleksei Smirnov as  crook
Arthur Nischenkin as  Klёnkin, security officer
Boris Yurchenko as  Chekist
Victor Uralsky as  watchman at the Kharkov station, White
Valentine Berezutskaya as  passenger
Nikolai Barmin as  the station
Vladimir Marenkov as  one-legged shoemaker, a liaison of the Whites
Valentin Grachev as  Sazonov, security officer
Yuri Leonidov as  Colonel Lebedev
Margarita Kosheleva as  Yura's mother
Margarita Krinitsyna as  lady on the stairs, whom Miron Osadchy questions about Gritsenko's lawyer
Sergei Kalinin as  Passenger (uncredited)
Konstantin Tyrtov as  prison sentry (episode)

Production
At first Mikhail Nozhkin was approved for the role of agent Koltsov and Yuri Solomin to play the supporting role of a staff officer.
But the film director Yevgeni Tashkov decided that Yuri Solomin was better suited to play the lead role.

For portraying the character of Captain Yuri Solomin Koltsov, Solomin was awarded the State Prize of the RSFSR and the title of "Honored Artist of the RSFSR".

References

External links

1969 films
Soviet black-and-white films
Mosfilm films
Russian Civil War films
1960s Russian-language films
Soviet television miniseries
1960s spy films
1960s Soviet television series
Soviet spy films
Films directed by Yevgeny Tashkov
1960s television miniseries
Russian black-and-white films